Bachofen is a surname. Notable people with the surname include:

 Elisa Bachofen (1891–1976), first woman civil engineer in Argentina
 Johann Caspar Bachofen (1695–1755), Swiss music teacher and composer
 Johann Jakob Bachofen (1815–1887), Swiss antiquarian, jurist, philologist, anthropologist, and professor

Surnames of Swiss origin